Kei Road is a town in Amathole District Municipality in the Eastern Cape province of South Africa.

Village 27 km north-east of King William’s Town and 24 km south-east of Stutterheim. It was so named after its situation on the military road between King William’s Town and the Kei River.

References

Populated places in the Amahlathi Local Municipality